Colonel Henry George Gore-Browne  (30 September 1830 – 15 November 1912) was born in Newtown, County Roscommon and was an Irish recipient of the Victoria Cross, the highest and most prestigious award for gallantry in the face of the enemy that can be awarded to British and Commonwealth forces.

Family
Henry George was the son of Arthur Browne, Esq. (d.1870), and his wife Anna Elizabeth Clements, daughter of Captain Clements.  He was a great-great grandson of the 1st Earl of Altamont MP, whose heir is the Marquess of Sligo. His great-grandfather was The Right Hon Arthur Browne MP, of Leixslip Castle.

He was educated at Trinity College Dublin.  He married Jane Anne Seely, daughter of Charles Seely MP on 10 April 1882.  Jane Anne Seely was the sister of Sir Charles Seely, 1st Baronet and the Aunt of J. E. B. Seely, 1st Baron Mottistone.

Details
He was 26 years old, and a captain in the 32nd Regiment of Foot (later The Duke of Cornwall's Light Infantry) in the British Army during the Indian Mutiny when the following deed took place on 21 August 1857 during the Siege of Lucknow for which he was awarded the VC:

Further information
He later achieved the rank of colonel of the 100th Regiment of Foot. He served as Magistrate for Hampshire and became a Deputy Governor of the Isle of Wight. He died at Shanklin on the Isle of Wight on 15 November 1912. He changed his name by deed poll in 1915 from Henry George Browne to Henry George Gore-Browne.

References

Listed in order of publication year 
The Register of the Victoria Cross (1981, 1988 and 1997)

Ireland's VCs  (Dept of Economic Development, 1995)
Monuments to Courage (David Harvey, 1999)
Irish Winners of the Victoria Cross (Richard Doherty & David Truesdale, 2000)

Burke's Peerage and Baronetage; 107th edition, vol. III

External links

1830 births
1912 deaths
Burials in the Isle of Wight
Alumni of Trinity College Dublin
British Army recipients of the Victoria Cross
Indian Rebellion of 1857 recipients of the Victoria Cross
Irish recipients of the Victoria Cross
Irish soldiers in the British Army
19th-century Irish people
People from County Roscommon
Prince of Wales's Leinster Regiment officers
32nd Regiment of Foot officers